General Khehla John Sitole  was National Commissioner of the South African Police Service from 2017 to 2022 when he left the post after consultation with the President of South Africa, Cyril Ramaphosa.

Early life 
He was born in Standerton, Mpumalanga and matriculated in 1984 from the Makhosana High School in Kwandebele.

Career 
In 1996, General Sitole was appointed as a senior manager with the rank of Director and in 2000 was appointed as an Assistant Commissioner in Mpumalanga. In 2006, he was appointed as the Deputy Provincial Commissioner for Human Resource Management in the Northern Cape and in 2010 General Sitole was appointed as the Deputy Provincial Commissioner for Human Resource Management in the Free State. 

From 2011 to 2013, General Sitole served as the Provincial Commissioner of the Free State with the rank of Lieutenant General and on the 1st October 2013 he was appointed as the Deputy National Commissioner, Policing. 

On 1 March 2016, he was appointed as the Divisional Commissioner of Protection and Security Services, a post he held until 22 November 2017 when he was appointed by His Excellency, the President of the Republic of South Africa, Mr JG Zuma, as the National Commissioner of the South African Police Service. 

He was embroiled in controversy almost from the beginning of his appointment. Sitole ultimately vacated the position after a scathing judgment handed down on 13 January 2021 by Judge Norman Davis in the Gauteng High Court.

Awards 
He has received the following decorations: 
  
 
 
 
 
 
 The Centenary Medal

Notes

References 

South African police officers
South African generals
Law enforcement in South Africa
Year of birth missing (living people)
Living people